Keep Loving is the 6th studio album by Claire Kuo.  It was released on 7 December 2012 by Linfair Records.

Track listing

References

Claire Kuo albums
2012 albums